William Kendell (6 March 1851 – 20 October 1922) was an Australian politician. Born in Mount Pleasant, South Australia, he was educated at public schools and moved to Victoria in 1888. He farmed at Wimmera and at Mount Mercier, and served on Dimboola and Borung Councils. In 1913, he was elected to the Australian House of Representatives as the Commonwealth Liberal Party member for Corio, defeating Labor MP Alfred Ozanne. Kendell was defeated by Ozanne in 1914, but in 1916 he was elected to the Victorian Legislative Council for North Eastern. He was an Honorary Minister from 1917 to 1919. He remained in the Legislative Council until his death in 1922.

References

Commonwealth Liberal Party members of the Parliament of Australia
Nationalist Party of Australia members of the Parliament of Victoria
Members of the Australian House of Representatives for Corio
Members of the Australian House of Representatives
Members of the Victorian Legislative Council
1851 births
1922 deaths
20th-century Australian politicians